Marshall S. Harris ( February 2, 1932 - November 2, 2009) was a politician and lawyer in the American state of Florida. He served in the Florida House of Representatives from 1966 to 1978, representing the 108th district.

References

1932 births
2009 deaths
Democratic Party members of the Florida House of Representatives
Harvard College alumni
Harvard Law School alumni